Diogène Ulysse Napoléon Maillart (28 October 1840 – 3 August 1926) was a French painter, illustrator, designer, teacher and art critic.

Biography 
He was born into a modest family of small farmers in Lachaussée-du-Bois-d'Écu. His first art lessons were at the "Imperial School of Design" (a government-sponsored craft school). Later, he studied at the École des Beaux-arts in the workshop of Léon Cogniet. He won the Prix de Rome in 1864, aged only twenty-three.

After returning from Rome in 1869, he was appointed a Professor of drawing at the Gobelins Manufactory, a position he occupied for fifty years. From 1873 to 1877, he was the Inspector of art works. He exhibited in the Salon every year until his death in 1926 in Paris.
 
After the founding of the Third Republic, he was involved in the decoration of several public buildings, including murals for Saint-Augustin Church (which had been started during the Second Empire), ceiling and staircase decorations for the Town Hall in the 3rd arrondissement and ornaments in the Bon Marché (now gone).

The building was burned by the Red Army in 1945 and the ruins were demolished in 1961. A series of murals he created for the City Hall in Beauvais also fared poorly; being destroyed by German bombs in 1940.

In addition to his painting, he was also a prolific author, writing a work on Byzantine art and a general history of the fine arts, in two volumes (among others). He became a knight in the Légion d’honneur in 1885. His grave in the Cimetière du Montparnasse is adorned with a bust sculpted by Henri-Léon Gréber.

Selected paintings

References

Further reading 
 Catherine Thieblin, Diogène Maillart. Sa vie (1840-1926), son œuvre, à Paris, en Ile-de-France et dans le Beauvaisis, Association pour la Promotion du Patrimoine local de l’Oise et du Beauvaisis, 2012

External links

 ArtNet: More works by Maillart
 (fr) Diogène Maillart on Base Mistral/Joconde
 Diogène Maillart at the Frick Art Reference Library

1840 births
1926 deaths
People from Oise
French history painters
Recipients of the Legion of Honour
Prix de Rome for painting
Burials at Montparnasse Cemetery
19th-century French painters
French male painters
20th-century French painters
20th-century French male artists
19th-century French male artists